Ørjan Håskjold Nyland (born 10 September 1990) is a Norwegian professional footballer who plays as a goalkeeper for Bundesliga club RB Leipzig and the Norway national team.

He has previously played for Hødd and was the man of the match in the 2012 Norwegian Football Cup Final. Nyland joined the defending Tippeligaen champions Molde ahead of the 2013 season. He signed for Aston Villa in August 2018, and stayed with the club until his contract was terminated in 2020. He then had short stints with Norwich City and Bournemouth, before joining Reading in March 2022. On 9 October 2022, he signed for Bundesliga club RB Leipzig on a nine-month contract deal until June 2023.

Nyland made his debut for Norway in 2013, and has previously represented Norway at youth level. He was the first-choice goalkeeper for the under-21 team at the 2013 UEFA European Under-21 Football Championship.

Club career
Nyland was born in Volda and was competing in handball, alpine skiing and football when he was young. As a footballer, Nyland played for Mork IL and Volda TI before he joined Hødd in 2007. Nyland did not play in his first year at the club due to the competition from Kim Deinoff and Vebjørn Skeide. Deinoff left Hødd after the 2007-season and for the next two seasons, Nyland was the second choice behind Skeide before Nyland became the first choice during the 2010 season.

Nyland has been regarded as one of the most talented goalkeepers in Norway, and was training with Rosenborg on two occasions in 2007, the English club Everton in December 2008 and Molde in November 2011. Nyland was in December 2011 one of six young goalkeepers selected for Frode Grodås's project The national goalkeeper of tomorrow 2014 initiated by the Football Association of Norway, where the goal was to develop the next national team goalkeeper.

Ahead of the 2012 season, Tromsø wanted to sign Nyland as a back-up for Marcus Sahlman, but did not afford to pay what Hødd demanded for the goalkeeper who had one year left of his contract. Nyland stayed at Hødd and was one of Hødd's best players during the 2012 season and won in October the Statoil Talent Prize, an award handed to outstanding young Norwegian footballers each month.

In the 2012 Norwegian Football Cup Final, Nyland delivered several match-winning saves and was named man of the match. Nyland also saved Remi Johansen's penalty when Hødd won 4–2 in the penalty shootout against Tromsø and won their first Norwegian Football Cup title.

After the season, the two Tippeligaen sides Start and Sogndal wanted to sign Nyland, who were a free agent, and publicly promised Nyland the spot as the first-choice goalkeeper if he signed for them. Lars Ivar Moldskred, who has acted as an advisor for Nyland, advised him to sign for Start, but he instead signed for defending Tippeligaen champions Molde where he were to compete with Espen Bugge Pettersen and Ole Söderberg.

Molde
Nyland made his first-team debut for Molde in the 5–0 victory against Elnesvågen og Omegn in the First Round of the 2013 Norwegian Football Cup. Nyland also played the Second Round tie against Byåsen before he made his debut in Tippeligaen in the 1–1 draw against Start on 6 May 2013. With Bugge Pettersen out with injury, Nyland soon became the preferred goalkeeper in Molde and played every match in Tippeligaen until the 17th round when the manager Ole Gunnar Solskjær wanted Nyland to rest. He signed new contract with Molde in September 2013, binding him to the club to the summer of 2018. Nyland missed a couple of matches in October due to an injury, but was back when Molde met Rosenborg on 26 October 2013. He played a total of 20 matches in Tippeligaen during the 2013 season, where Molde finished 6th.

FC Ingolstadt 04
On 1 July 2015, Nyland signed a four-year contract with newly promoted Bundesliga side FC Ingolstadt 04 for an undisclosed fee.
Nyland made his Bundesliga debut in a 0–4 home defeat against Borussia Dortmund on 23 August 2015.

Aston Villa
On 7 August 2018, Aston Villa revealed that they had signed Nyland on a three-year contract.

On 18 June 2020, Nyland was involved in a controversy after he appeared to carry the ball across the goal line after saving a free kick from Oliver Norwood and colliding with one of his own defenders. Because of interference with the Hawk-Eye goal line technology, play was allowed to continue and Sheffield United was denied a goal.

In the summer of 2020, Aston Villa signed Emiliano Martínez from Arsenal. Nyland fell from the first team and was linked with a move to another team. He made one appearance in the 2020–21 season before departing Villa by agreeing a mutual termination of his contract on 5 October 2020.

Norwich City
On 1 February 2021, Nyland signed for Norwich City for the remainder of the 2020–21 season. On 26 June 2021, he announced his departure from Norwich City.

Bournemouth
Nyland signed with Championship club Bournemouth on a free transfer on 17 August 2021. A week later, he made his debut for the club in the second round of the EFL Cup against former club Norwich City, conceding six goals in the process as the Cherries fell to a 0–6 defeat. On 31st January 2022, Bournemouth and Nyland agreed to terminate his contract but he remained at the Cherries to train to assist with his injury recovery.

Reading
On 10 March 2022, Nyland signed for Reading on a short-term contract until the end of the 2021–22 season. On 20 May 2022, Reading confirmed that Nyland would leave the club upon the expiration of his contract.

RB Leipzig
On 9 October 2022, Nyland joined RB Leipzig until June 2023, as a replacement for injured Péter Gulácsi and Janis Blaswich.

International career
Nyland represented Norway from under-16 to under-18 level, but was not selected for youth international teams for two years because he didn't play regularly at Hødd. After he became first-choice goalkeeper at Hødd, he was called up for the under-21 team in June 2011 and made his debut for the team in the 1–4 loss against Sweden U21.

Nyland became a regular in Per Joar Hansen's U21-squad in 2012, where he was the second-choice goalkeeper behind Arild Østbø. Nyland played the last play-off match against France U21 when Østbø was unavailable due to an injury. Nyland received praise for his performance in that match, which was his third appearance for the under-21 team, when they qualified for the 2013 UEFA European Under-21 Football Championship after beating France U21 5–3.

As one of three goalkeepers, Nyland was included in the Norwegian squad for the under-21 championship, along with Arild Østbø and Gudmund Taksdal Kongshavn. Ahead of the championship, the head coach Tor Ole Skullerud hadn't decided whether he was using Østbø, who was the preferred choice in the qualification, or any of the two other goalkeepers who had both impressed for their teams in the start of the 2013 Tippeligaen season. Nyland was chosen to play the opening match against the hosts Israel U-21, and played three out of four matches in the championship, with Østbø playing the last group-stage match against Italy U-21. The Norwegian team was defeated by eventual winners Spain U-21 in the semi-final, and won a bronze-medal. Nyland was praised for his performances in the championship, especially in the match against Spain, and he was included in The Guardians "team of the tournament", at the expense of David de Gea. Nyland was also included in UEFA's "all-star squad" together with his compatriot Stefan Strandberg.

Nyland was first called up for the Norwegian national team squad for the World Cup qualifiers against Cyprus and Switzerland in September 2013. He made his debut for the national team in the friendly match against Scotland on 20 November 2013, on Molde's home ground Aker Stadion.

Career statistics
Club

International

HonoursHøddNorwegian Cup: 2012MoldeTippeligaen: 2014
Norwegian Cup: 2013, 2014Aston VillaEFL Cup runner-up: 2019–20Norway U21UEFA European Under-21 Championship bronze: 2013Individual'
UEFA European Under-21 Championship Team of the Tournament: 2013
Tippeligaen Goalkeeper of the Year: 2014, 2015

References

External links

 
Profile at the RB Leipzig website

1990 births
Living people
People from Volda
Sportspeople from Møre og Romsdal
Norwegian footballers
Norway international footballers
Norway under-21 international footballers
Association football goalkeepers
IL Hødd players
Molde FK players
FC Ingolstadt 04 players
FC Ingolstadt 04 II players
Aston Villa F.C. players
Norwich City F.C. players
AFC Bournemouth players
Reading F.C. players
RB Leipzig players
Norwegian First Division players
Eliteserien players
Bundesliga players
2. Bundesliga players
Regionalliga players
English Football League players
Premier League players
Expatriate footballers in Germany
Norwegian expatriate footballers
Norwegian expatriate sportspeople in Germany
Expatriate footballers in England
Norwegian expatriate sportspeople in England